Delicious is the second studio album by German pop singer Jeanette Biedermann. It was released by Universal Records on 12 November 2001 in German-speaking Europe. In 2002, the album was certified gold by the Bundesverband Musikindustrie (BVMI).

Track listing

Additional information
 How It's Got to Be is based on the classic tune Swan Lake by Peter Tchaikovski.
 Deep In My Heart is based on Adagio in G minor by Remo Giazotto.

Charts

Certifications

References

Jeanette Biedermann albums
2001 albums